Feel Flows: The Sunflower & Surf's Up Sessions 1969–1971 is an expanded reissue of the albums Sunflower (1970) and Surf's Up (1971) by American rock band the Beach Boys. It was released by Capitol/UME on August 27, 2021 and was produced by Mark Linett and Alan Boyd. Feel Flows is the band's first major archival release since Wake the World and I Can Hear Music in 2018, and the first issued on physical media since Sunshine Tomorrow in 2017. The title is taken from the Surf's Up track "Feel Flows".

Four separate editions of the compilation were made available: a five-CD box set, a two-CD set, a double vinyl set, and a quadruple vinyl set. The box set includes remastered editions of the Sunflower and Surf's Up albums alongside 108 previously unreleased tracks, the majority of which are session highlights, alternate versions, and alternate mixes (including instrumental and a cappella mixes). Feel Flows also includes live performances, radio promos, and outtakes not originally included on either album, as well as several tracks drawn from Dennis Wilson's aborted solo album, Poops/Hubba Hubba.

Feel Flows received largely positive reviews. Criticism was reserved for the poor mastering quality, particularly with respect to the presence of digital artifacts, excessive treble, and extreme dynamic range compression. It peaked at number 83 in the U.S and number 19 in the UK while also reaching the top 20 on record charts in the Netherlands, Germany, and Scotland. A sequel compilation, Sail On Sailor – 1972, followed in 2022.

Background

Feel Flows was produced by engineer Mark Linett and archive manager Alan Boyd. New interviews were conducted with Al Jardine, Bruce Johnston, Mike Love, and Brian Wilson for the liner notes. According to music critic Howie Edelson, he, Linett, and Boyd had "worked on it [since 2018]. Those two put the whole f ucking  thing together. Hours and hours and hours and hours. As the official BRI consultant, I was asked my opinion throughout and consulted with brains and heart."

The compilation was assembled in four different formats: 5CD box, 2CD set, 4LP set and 2LP set. The box set includes a 48-page booklet, edited by Edelson, and newly remastered versions of Sunflower and Surf's Up along with 108 previously unreleased tracks. The majority of those tracks constitute session highlights, alternate versions, and alternate mixes (including instrumental and a capella mixes), with a lesser percentage reserved for live performances, radio promos, and outtakes not originally included on either album. Disc five includes several tracks drawn from Dennis Wilson's aborted solo album, Poops/Hubba Hubba, that he wrote with Beach Boys touring musician Daryl Dragon.

Studio recordings that had not seen release in any form include "'Til I Die" (piano demo), "Big Sur" (1970 version), "Sweet and Bitter", "My Solution", "Seasons in the Sun", "Baby Baby", "Awake", "It's a New Day", "Medley: All of My Love / Ecology", "Before",  "Behold the Night", "Old Movie (Cuddle Up)", "Hawaiian Dream", "I've Got a Friend", "You Never Give Me Your Money", and "Won't You Tell Me" (demo).

Versions of "Marcella" and "You Need a Mess of Help to Stand Alone" were included as teasers for the next archival release, Sail On Sailor – 1972.

Release
In December 2019, as part of their annual copyright extension releases, Capitol and UMG issued 1969: I'm Going Your Way, an EP that consisted of three unreleased tracks drawn from the Sunflower sessions: "I'm Going Your Way", "Slip On Through" (an alternate version), and "Carnival (Over the Waves)". Jardine and Johnston told fans that the EP may soon be followed with a more extensive release dedicated to Sunflower and Surf's Up. In February 2020, Linett stated that he hoped the set would be released in the autumn. "We're waiting on a release date. It's a large project, so it takes a bit of finesse to get it all done and approved, but we're still working on it." The set was reported complete in July. 

Feel Flows had originally been ready for issue in 2020. Band insiders, including Edelson, later reported on a Beach Boys message board that the release had stalled for undisclosed reasons. Biographer Jon Stebbins wrote that the delay was due to a "a one or two man circular firing squad ... Look at the history of the band, the answer is obvious. Finding a way to f*** up a beautiful thing. It's in the DNA of the Beach Boys." According to reporter Joel Goldenberg, many fans speculated that Mike Love was responsible for stalling the compilation, and petitions that called for its release were posted online. At the time, the band were in the process of selling a majority stake in their intellectual property to Irving Azoff and his new company Iconic Artists Group.

In November 2020, a Beach Boys entry titled 1970 Release was uploaded to AllMusic's website containing 64 30-second samples of unreleased material and alternate mixes from the band's 1969 to 1970 period. The page was removed, although fans quickly reuploaded the samples to YouTube. On November 22, Jardine stated that the Feel Flows project currently had a tentative release date of May or June 2021. In March 2021, engineer Stephen Desper reported that the release date had been scheduled for July 2021. Love confirmed that the set would be released "pretty soon".

On June 2, 2021, the track listing leaked. Feel Flows was officially announced the next day, with a release date of July 30. "Big Sur" was issued in various formats to commemorate the announcement. On June 26, Feel Flows was once again delayed, this time to August 27. Edelson wrote that the reason was "[n]othing untoward, weird, or sinister -- just a scheduling thing, as is commonplace."

Critical reception

At Metacritic, which assigns a normalized rating out of 100 to reviews from critics, Feel Flows received an average score of 87 based on 10 reviews, indicating "universal acclaim". Uncuts Rob Hughes wrote that Feel Flows contains "a trove of hidden revelations". Hughes highlighted the live tracks and Dennis' unreleased songs, concluding that "Feel Flows is emphatic proof that The Beach Boys never stopped making sublime, artful, spiritually invested music, no matter how far they'd fallen in popular opinion." 

Reviewing the box set for Ultimate Classic Rock, Michael Gallucci decreed that Sunflower and Surf's Up were among the band's best albums and that there "aren't too many rough patches" spread across the bonus tracks. "Nothing here will attract listeners who think the Beach Boys faded into irrelevance after the mid-'60s, but fans will discover plenty of exceptional and unheard tracks from one of their most fertile and productive runs." AllMusic reviewer Fred Thomas felt, "Most casual listeners will be daunted by the depths to which the massive set travels, but it's must-hear material for the committed and the fascinated."

Pastes Robert Ham took issue with the overcompressed mixes and the presence of digital artifacts.

Track listing

5-CD edition

Disc one

Disc two

Disc three
All subsequent tracks were previously unreleased.

Disc four

Disc five

2-CD edition

Disc one
Sunflower 2019 remaster – as above

Disc two
''Surf's Up 2019 remaster – as above

Double LP edition

Quadruple LP editionFirst LP, sides one and two – Sunflower 2019 remaster and bonus tracks – same running order as 1st LP of double LP editionThird LP, sides one and two – Surf's Up'' 2019 remaster and bonus tracks – same running order as 2nd LP of double LP edition

Charts

See also
 The Beach Boys bootleg recordings
 List of unreleased songs recorded by the Beach Boys

References

External links
 Feel Flows playlist on YouTube (licensed audio)
 
 Record Collector Mag interview with Mark Linett and Alan Boyd

The Beach Boys compilation albums
Capitol Records compilation albums
2021 compilation albums
Albums produced by Mark Linett
Reissue albums
Compilation albums published posthumously